China Railway Materials Commercial Corp. (CRMCC) is a state-owned company of China, under the supervision of State-owned Assets Supervision and Administration Commission of the State Council.

The predecessor of the group was the Materials Administration Bureau of the Ministry of Railways.

The major subsidiary of the group was China Railway Materials Co., Ltd. (CRM). In 2010, most of the assets of CRMCC was injected to CRM, excluding the investment vehicle of CRMCC: China Railway Materials Investment; A plan to float CRM in Shanghai and Hong Kong Stock Exchange was announced in the same year. However, the company did not proceed the initial public offering.

The company was a partner of former Australian listed company FerrAUS Limited, Swiss company African Iron Ore Group and British listed company African Minerals Limited.

References

External links
 China Railway Materials Commercial Corporate
 China Railway Materials Company Limited

Government-owned companies of China
Organizations established in 1949